Meru may refer to:

Geography

Kenya
 Meru, Kenya, a city in Meru County, Kenya
 Meru County, created by the merger of
 Meru Central District
 Meru North District
 Meru South District
 Meru National Park, a Kenyan wildlife park

Tanzania
 Meru District, a district in Arusha Region, Tanzania
 Meru, Tanzania, a village in northern Tanzania (Meru District)
 Mount Meru (Tanzania), a volcano near Arusha in northern Tanzania

Other places
 Meru, Hazaribagh, a small town in Jharkhand, India
 Meru, Malaysia, a town in Klang, located in Selangor
 Meru, Western Australia, a locality near Geraldton
 Méru, a commune of the Oise département in France
 Meru Peak, a mountain in the Indian Himalayas, not to be confused with Mount Meru (see the section Other below)

Entertainment
 Meru (film), a 2015 documentary about climbing Meru Peak
 Prince Meru (Sgt. Frog), main character from the anime movie Keroro Gunso the Super Movie 2: The Deep Sea Princess
 Meru (Legend of Dragoon), a playable character from the video games The Legend of Dragoon

People

Ethnic groups 
 Meru people, also known as Amîîrú, a people of Kenya
 Meru, another name for the Aboriginal Australian Erawirung people of South Australia
 Wameru, Bantu for the Meru people of northern Tanzania

Individuals 
 Meru (overseer of sealers), an Ancient Egyptian official under king Mentuhotep II in the Eleventh Dynasty
 Vatsu Meru, politician from Nagaland, India

Organizations
 Meru Networks, a supplier of wireless local area networks that was acquired by and integrated into Fortinet in 2015
 Meru Cabs, a taxi aggregator company based in Mumbai, India.
 Maharishi European Research University (MERU), a school that researches transcendental meditation
 MERU, Holland, the current location in Vlodrop, Netherlands

Other uses
 Meru (beetle), a family of aquatic beetles
 Meru language, the language spoken by the Meru people (Ameru)
 Milli Earth Rate Unit, an angular velocity equal to 1/1000 of Earth's rotation rate; see inertial navigation system
 Maha Meru, a 3-dimensional Sri Chakra Yantra
 Mount Meru, a mountain in Hindu, Jain and Buddhist mythology
 Pelinggih meru, the multiple tiered roofs similar to pagoda in Balinese temple
 An alternate (erroneous) name for Mount Kailash

See also
Mweru (disambiguation)
Meroo National Park, a national park in on South Coast of New South Wales, Australia

Language and nationality disambiguation pages